Keyboard concerto refers to a concerto for one or more keyboard instruments, usually with an orchestral accompaniment.

Types of keyboard concertos include:
 Harpsichord concerto
 Organ concerto
 Piano concerto

Keyboard

es:Concierto para teclado